Malvy is a surname. Notable people with the surname include: 

Martin Malvy (born 1936), French politician
Louis-Jean Malvy (1875–1949), Interior Minister of France in 1914

See also
Malvoy